Margaret Bowman Jude (born 1 August 1940) is an Australian former cricketer who played as a wicket-keeper and right-handed batter. She appeared in one Test match for Australia in 1963, and five One Day Internationals for International XI at the 1973 World Cup. She played domestic cricket for South Australia, as well as playing in various friendly matches for Middlesex and Thames Valley.

References

External links
 
 

1940 births
Living people
Cricketers from Adelaide
Australia women Test cricketers
Australia women One Day International cricketers
International XI women One Day International cricketers
South Australian Scorpions cricketers
Australian expatriate sportspeople in England
Sportswomen from South Australia